GKP may refer to:

 German Kino Plus, an American German-language television channel
 Gorakhpur Junction railway station
 Gulf Keystone Petroleum, a British oil and gas exploration company operating in Iraqi Kurdistan
 Guinea Kpelle language
 The General Knowledge Paper, run by King William's College